The Battle of Karasounk, i.e. the Forty, took place in 863 when some Muslim emirs attacked Armenia, defended by Prince Ashot Bagratouni with, according to reports, 40,000 men. The Armenians defeated the 80,000 Muslims decisively on the shores of the Araxes.  The caliph of the Abbasids Al-Musta'in bi-llah granted Ashot the title of "Prince of Princes of Armenia, of Georgia and of the lands of the Caucasus". 

Before the battle there was a crisis in the Abbasid Caliphate that erupted after the death of al-Mutawakkil in 861 AD, where the autonomy of the Armenian Principality greatly increased since the Sparapet of Armenia Ashot Bagratuni, also known as the son of Smbat VIII the Confessor took advantage of the opportunity. 21 years after the defeat of the Abbasid Caliphate, Armenian autonomy became independent and Ashot V was made the first king of the Kingdom of Armenia by Kevork II, the former Catholicos of the Armenian Church under the name of "Ashot I the Great" or "Ashot I Bagratuni" in 844 AD.

References

Battles involving Armenia